During the 2006–07 R.S.C. Anderlecht season, the club competed in the Belgian Pro League, Belgian Cup, Belgian Supercup and UEFA Champions League.

Results
Results for Anderlecht for 2006–07.

Friendly matches

Trofeo Santiago Bernabéu

Belgian First Division

League table

Belgian Cup

Belgian Super Cup

UEFA Champions League

2006–07 transfers

Summer 2006
In:

Out:

Winter 2006–07
In:

Out:

Appearances and goals
As of 10 April 2007, includes all Belgian Pro League, UEFA Champions League, Belgian Cup and Supercup matches. Excludes friendlies.

See also
List of R.S.C. Anderlecht seasons

References

R.S.C. Anderlecht seasons
Anderlecht
Belgian football championship-winning seasons